Scott Spinelli is an American college basketball coach. Spinelli is most notorious for his unique recruiting abilities, as he has sent a total of five unranked recruits to the NBA from three different schools.

Playing career
Scott Spinelli was born in Leominster, Massachusetts. He is a 1989 graduate of Boston University, where he was a member of the basketball team under coach Mike Jarvis, helping the Terriers advance to the NCAA tournament in 1988.

Coaching career
Widely regarded as one of the top assistant coaches in college basketball, Spinelli has earned a reputation as an excellent recruiter and game tactician during a career that has seen him have success at every level of basketball.

He began his coaching career on the prep level in 1990 at Milford Academy, where he spent three seasons as head coach and coached several Division I prospects. In 1993, Spinelli started the basketball program at The Winchendon School in Winchendon, Mass., where in the first three years of the program's history, he led them to two appearances in the NEPSAC Class A Tournament championship game. Spinelli also produced numerous Division I players at Winchendon, including former McDonald's All-American Randell Jackson, who played in the NBA with the Washington Wizards and Dallas Mavericks.

From 1996–1999, Spinelli spent time as an assistant coach at Wyoming and American, where he recruited two nationally ranked classes. In 2000, he became a scout for the Philadelphia 76ers, where he spent one season before returning to the college level. From 2001–2003, he served as an assistant coach at Loyola-Chicago, as the Ramblers won their most games since the 1980s and earned a Horizon League Championship berth.

In 2003, Spinelli became an assistant coach under Barry Collier at Nebraska, where the Cornhuskers reached the postseason twice. Collier is now the Athletic Director at Butler University and the man responsible for hiring Brad Stevens.

Spinelli then served as an assistant coach at Wichita State University during the 2006–2007 season. This became the first of three schools that he served as assistant coach under head coach Mark Turgeon. The Shockers were ranked as high as #8 in the AP Poll and were victorious over George Mason, LSU and Syracuse on the road.

After former Texas A&M head men's basketball coach Billy Gillispie left to coach at Kentucky, Turgeon was immediately hired as head coach of the Aggies on April 10, 2007, thus bringing Spinelli with him to serve as his top assistant. Turgeon and Spinelli acquired all of Gillispie's recruits for the 2007–08 season, including 5 star-rated DeAndre Jordan. The Aggies started the season ranked 14th in the preseason Coaches Poll.

Spinelli enjoyed great success during his four-year stint as the top assistant at Texas A&M. From 2007–2011, the Aggies won 102 games, which still stands as their greatest four-year win total in school history. The program also won the 2007 NIT Preseason Tip-Off and earned a berth to the NCAA Tournament all four years, while advancing to the round of 32 in 2008, 2009 and 2010.

In May 2011, Turgeon met with his coaching staff and players to inform them that half an hour earlier he accepted the head coach position at the University of Maryland. Turgeon quickly offered Spinelli a position on his staff at Maryland, which was accepted. While at Maryland, Spinelli helped the program land three recruiting classes, all nationally ranked in the top 25, including a top 10 class in 2014. The 2012-13 Terrapins won 25 games and reached an NIT Final Four. They were also the only program in the country to beat Duke twice in that season.
 
In 2014, it was announced that Spinelli had accepted an assistant coaching position at Boston College under head coach Jim Christian. During the 2017–2018 season, the Eagles won their most games since 2010-2011 and knocked off #1 ranked Duke.

On February 15, 2021, Spinelli was named the Interim Head Coach at Boston College.

Recruiting
Spinelli is regarded as one of the top recruiters in the country, who has the unique ability to find "diamonds in the rough." A defier of player rankings, Spinelli has proven numerous times that he can turn unheralded recruits into NBA stars. Spinelli's impact has been felt at all of his coaching stops.

While at Nebraska, Spinelli signed two nationally ranked recruiting classes and recruited all Big 12 selection Aleks Maric. Collier, the head coach at the time stated, “The leadership part is being able to find students that fit ability-wise and character-wise. I think Scott (can do) both. “This is a whole thing about treating people the right way, and he does that.” 

Spinelli has now sent players to the National Basketball Association (NBA) from three different schools. While at Texas A&M, Spinelli recruited 3x NBA All-Star and current Milwaukee Bucks forward, Khris Middleton, as well as current Brooklyn Nets star DeAndre Jordan. Over the years, Middleton has credited Spinelli for getting him to where he is today. “Coach Spinelli is one of the best coaches I have had. He has a great command and passion in his ability to recruit top level talent, but also develop and motivate that talent to reach its full potential. It is exactly what he was able to do for me. He is one of the main reasons I’m able to fulfill my dream of playing in the NBA.”  Middleton scored a career-high 51 points in a Bucks win over the Washington Wizards on January 28, 2020. Middleton nearly became the fifth player in NBA history to average 20+ points per game on 50% FG, 40% 3PT & 90% FT during the 2019-2020 NBA season.

As an assistant coach under Turgeon at Maryland, Spinelli recruited current Washington Wizards center Alex Len and Minnesota Timberwolves forward Jake Layman. Turgeon said, “Scott is a terrific recruiter and teacher. He is very passionate and has a strong feel for the game. Scott has been successful at every stop and is more than ready to lead a program. Scott is a bulldog recruiter with tremendous connections across the country. He is also an excellent coach with a tremendous basketball mind."

In his current position at Boston College, Spinelli was the lead recruiter of current Washington Wizards forward Jerome Robinson and Golden State Warriors guard Ky Bowman. Robinson was drafted with the 13th overall pick in the 2018 draft by the Los Angeles Clippers, becoming the first ever lottery pick out of Boston College. When Robinson was selected by the Clippers, he said, “Coach Spinelli has changed my life more than any coach I have ever had. From Day 1, as an unheralded HS recruit, he had a vision for me to reach my full potential. While many may have visions, Coach Spinelli also has the knowledge, experience, and positive energy that kept me focused and working not only towards achieving my dream of playing in the NBA, but making me a complete athlete, socially & academically. Coach believes in being prepared for when the ball stops bouncing also! If it was not for him, and his belief in me, I would not be where I am today. Forever my coach, friend, mentor, and part of my family!”

Recruits Sent to NBA
 Khris Middleton - 2012 NBA Draft (Round: 2 / Pick: 39)
 DeAndre Jordan - 2008 NBA Draft (Round: 2 / Pick: 35)
 Alex Len - 2013 NBA Draft (Round: 1 / Pick: 5)
 Jake Layman - 2016 NBA Draft (Round: 2 / Pick: 47)
 Jerome Robinson - 2018 NBA Draft (Round: 1 / Pick: 13)
 Ky Bowman - 2019 NBA Draft (Undrafted / Signed as FA)

Head coaching record

References

1966 births
Living people
Basketball coaches from Massachusetts
American men's basketball players
Basketball players from Massachusetts
Boston University Terriers men's basketball players
Loyola Ramblers men's basketball coaches
Wichita State Shockers men's basketball coaches
Nebraska Cornhuskers men's basketball coaches
Texas A&M Aggies men's basketball coaches
Maryland Terrapins men's basketball coaches
Boston College Eagles men's basketball coaches
People from Leominster, Massachusetts
Sportspeople from Worcester County, Massachusetts